A rubāʿī or chahārgāna is a poem or a verse of a poem in Persian poetry (or its derivative in English and other languages) in the form of a quatrain, consisting of four lines.

In classical Persian poetry, the ruba'i is written as a four-line (or two-couplet) poem, with a rhyme-scheme AABA or AAAA.

This is an example of a ruba'i from Rūmī's Dīwān-i Shams:

Metre

The usual metre of a Persian ruba'i, which is used for all four lines of the above quatrain by Rumi, is as follows:
 – – u u – u – u – – u u –

In the above scheme, "–" represents a long syllable, and "u" a short one. As variations of this scheme, any sequence of – u can be replaced by a single "overlong" syllable, such as gēkh, tīf, luṭf in the poem above, containing either a long vowel followed by a consonant other than "n", or a short vowel followed by two consonants. An overlong syllable can also freely be substituted for the final syllable of the line, as with bād above.

Another variation is that occasionally a sequence of two short syllables (u u) can be replaced by a single long one (–).

A third variation is to use the same metre as above, but with the sixth and seventh syllables reversed:
 – – u u – – u u – – u u –

In English
The verse form AABA as used in English verse is known as the Rubaiyat Quatrain due to its use by Edward FitzGerald in his famous 1859 translation, Rubaiyat of Omar Khayyam. Algernon Charles Swinburne, one of the first admirers of FitzGerald's translation of Khayyam's medieval Persian verses, was the first to imitate the stanza form, which subsequently became popular and was used widely, as in the case of Robert Frost's 1922 poem "Stopping by Woods on a Snowy Evening".

FitzGerald's translation became so popular by the turn of the century that hundreds of American humorists wrote parodies using the form and, to varying degrees, the content of his stanzas, including The Rubaiyat of Ohow Dryyam, The Rubaiyat of A Persian Kitten, The Rubaiyat of Omar Cayenne and The Rubaiyat of Omar Khayyam, Jr.

Quatrain VII from the fourth edition of FitzGerald's Rubaiyat:
Come, fill the Cup, and in the fire of Spring 
Your Winter-garment of Repentance fling: 
The Bird of Time has but a little way 
To flutter—and the Bird is on the Wing. 

In extended sequences of ruba'i stanzas, the convention is sometimes extended so that the unrhymed line of the current stanza becomes the rhyme for the following stanza. The structure can be made cyclical by linking the unrhymed line of the final stanza back to the first stanza: ZZAZ. These more stringent systems were not, however, used by FitzGerald in his Rubaiyat.

See also 

 Rubaiyat of Omar Khayyam

References

External links

Tajik girls reciting ruba'i quatrains

Stanzaic form
Persian literature
Medieval poetry
Iranian inventions
Literary genres